Master Plan is an album by the American drummer Dave Weckl, released in 1990. It peaked at No. 9 on Billboard'''s Top Contemporary Jazz Albums chart.

Production
The title track was written by Chick Corea. Tom Kennedy played bass on the album.

Critical reception

The Chicago Tribune wrote that, "from Corea to straight jazz to funk, Master Plan shows every aspect of Weckl's ability." The Calgary Herald noted that, "while [the album] impresses as a primer for drumming enthusiasts, it suffers from a lack of imagination in the writing." The Orange County Register'' opined that "Eric Marienthal contributes some excellent solos on alto and soprano saxophone."

Track listing
 "Tower of Inspiration" - 3:59
 "Here and There" - 6:08
 "Festival de Ritmo" - 4:52
 "In Common" - 5:55
 "Garden Wall" - 4:32
 "Auratune" - 4:47
 "Softly, as in a Morning Sunrise" - 5:01
 "Master Plan" - 8:14
 "Island Magic" - 4:55

Personnel
Dave Weckl - Drums
Eric Marienthal (2-4) - Saxophone
Jay Oliver (1-6, 8, 9) - Keyboards, Piano
Chick Corea (5, 8, 9) - Synthesizer, Piano
Michael Brecker (5) - Tenor Saxophone
Steve Gadd (8) - Drums
Anthony Jackson (2-5, 8, 9) - Bass
Jerry Hey (1, 3) - Trumpet
Bill Reichenbach Jr. (1) - Trombone
Tom Kennedy (1, 7) - Bass
Ray Kennedy (7) - Piano
Peter Mayer (2, 4, 6) - Guitar
Scott Alspach (6) - Trumpet
Dave Grusin - Producer, Executive Producer

References

Dave Weckl albums
1990 albums
GRP Records albums